Hassan Shamsid-Deen (born January 21, 1976) is a former American football defensive back who played four seasons in the Arena Football League with the Grand Rapids Rampage and Dallas Desperados. He played college football at North Carolina State University. He was also a member of the Orlando Rage of the XFL. Shamsid-Deen suffered a separated shoulder in the opening scramble prior to the Rage's 33–29 season-opening win over the Chicago Enforcers on February 3, 2001. He missed the remainder of the season.

References

External links
Just Sports Stats
College stats

Living people
1976 births
Players of American football from Atlanta
American football defensive backs
African-American players of American football
NC State Wolfpack football players
Grand Rapids Rampage players
Orlando Rage players
Dallas Desperados players